Taren Point Road is a major road found in Taren Point and Caringbah, New South Wales, Australia.

Taren Point Road starts from Captain Cook Bridge, Taren Point and continues to Gardere Street, Caringbah. Traffic travelling north heads towards Sans Souci, and onwards to the city. Traffic travelling south heads towards Miranda or Cronulla. Taren Point Road begins and ends within the Sutherland Shire local government area.

Taren Point Road is three lanes in both directions. There are five traffic light intersections along the road. Transit Systems routes 477 and 478 use Taren Point Road. According to a newspaper report in February 2015, there are a total of 56,000 vehicular movements on Taren Point Road every day and the road delivers and accepts an estimated 30,600 vehicles from the Captain Cook Bridge.

Further road changes were announced in 2018, along with extended clearways, in further attempts to reduce congestion.

Taren Point Road would be a joining section of a long proposed extension of the Princes Motorway to extend closer to the City.

Landmarks
Captain Cook Bridge
Endeavour High School

References

See also

Caringbah
Taren Point

Streets in Sydney